A determiner, also called determinative (abbreviated ), is a word, phrase, or affix that occurs together with a noun or noun phrase and generally serves to express the reference of that noun or noun phrase in the context. That is, a determiner may indicate whether the noun is referring to a definite or indefinite element of a class, to a closer or more distant element, to an element belonging to a specified person or thing, to a particular number or quantity, etc. Common kinds of determiners include definite and indefinite articles (the, a), demonstratives (this, that), possessive determiners (my, their), cardinal numerals (one, two), quantifiers (many, both), distributive determiners (each, every), and interrogative determiners (which, what).

Description
Most determiners have been traditionally classed either as adjectives or pronouns, and this still occurs in traditional grammars: for example, demonstrative and possessive determiners are sometimes described as demonstrative adjectives and possessive adjectives or as (adjectival) demonstrative pronouns and (adjectival) possessive pronouns respectively. These traditional interpretations of determiners are related to some of the linguistic properties of determiners in modern syntax theories, such as deictic information, definiteness and genitive case. However, modern theorists of grammar tend to distinguish determiners as a separate word class from adjectives, which are simple modifiers of nouns, expressing attributes of the thing referred to. This distinction applies particularly in languages, such as English, that use definite and indefinite articles frequently as a necessary component of noun phrases—the determiners may then be taken to be a class of words that includes the articles as well as other words that function in the place of articles. (The composition of this class may depend on the particular language's rules of syntax; for example, in English the possessives my, your etc. are used without articles and so can be regarded as determiners, whereas their Italian equivalents  etc. are used together with articles and so may be better classed as adjectives.)  Not all languages can be said to have a lexically distinct class of determiners.

In some languages, the role of certain determiners can be played by affixes (prefixes or suffixes) attached to a noun or by other types of inflection. For example, definite articles are represented by suffixes in Romanian, Bulgarian, Macedonian, and Swedish. (For example, in Swedish,  ("book"), when definite, becomes  ("the book"), while the Romanian  ("notebook") similarly becomes caietul ("the notebook").) Some languages, such as Finnish, have possessive affixes, which play the role of possessive determiners like my and his.

Universal grammar is the theory that all humans are born equipped with grammar, and all languages share certain properties. There are arguments that determiners are not a part of universal grammar and are instead part of an emergent syntactic category. This has been shown through the studies of some languages' histories, including Dutch.

Syntactic order 
Determiners may be predeterminers, central determiners or postdeterminers, based on the order in which they can occur. For example, "all my many very young children" uses one of each. "My all many very young children" is not grammatically correct because a central determiner cannot precede a predeterminer.

Determiners and pronouns 
Determiners are distinguished from pronouns by the presence of nouns.
 Each went his own way. (Each is used as a pronoun, without an accompanying noun.)
 Each man went his own way. (Each is used as a determiner, accompanying the noun man.)
Plural personal pronouns can act as determiners in certain constructions.

 We linguists aren’t stupid.
 I'll give you boys three hours to finish the job!
 Nobody listens to us students.

Some theoreticians unify determiners and pronouns into a single class. For further information, see .

Articles
Articles are words used (as a standalone word or a prefix or suffix) to specify the grammatical definiteness of a noun, and, in some languages, volume or numerical scope.

Definite article
The definite article in the English language is the word the. It denotes people, places, and things that have already been mentioned, implied, or presumed to be known by the listener.

Indefinite article
The indefinite article takes the forms of a and an in English. It is mostly synonymous with one, but the word one is usually used when emphasizing singularity.

Demonstratives
Demonstratives are words, such as this and that, used to indicate which entities are being referred to and to distinguish those entities from others. They are usually deictic, which means their meaning changes with context. They can indicate how close the things being referenced are to the speaker, listener, or other group of people. In the English language, demonstratives express proximity of things with respect to the speaker.

Proximal demonstratives
In English, the words this and these are the proximal demonstratives. They express that the particular things being mentioned are very close to the speaker.

Distal demonstratives
The distal demonstratives in the English language are that and those. They express that there is some distance between the things being referenced and the speaker.

Possessive determiner
Possessive determiners such as my and their modify a noun by attributing possession (or other sense of belonging) to someone or something. They are also known as possessive adjectives.

Quantifiers
Quantifiers indicate quantity. Some examples of quantifiers include: all, some, many, little, few, and no. Quantifiers only indicate a general quantity of objects, not a precise number such as twelve, dozen, first, single, or once (which are considered numerals).

Distributive determiners
Distributive determiners, also called distributive adjectives, consider members of a group separately, rather than collectively. Words such as each and every are examples of distributive determiners.

Interrogative determiners 
Interrogatives are used to ask a question, such as which, what.

As a functional head

Some modern grammatical approaches regard determiners as heads of their own phrases. In such approaches, noun phrases are generally dominated by determiner phrases whose heads are often null. Noun phrases that contain only a noun and do not have a determiner present are known as bare noun phrases. For more detail on theoretical approaches to the status of determiners, see .

Some theoreticians analyze pronouns as determiners or determiner phrases. See Pronoun: Theoretical considerations. This is consistent with the determiner phrase viewpoint, whereby a determiner, rather than the noun that follows it, is taken to be the head of the phrase.

See also 
 Classifier (linguistics)
 Conservativity
 Determiner spreading
 English determiners

References

External links 
 GrammarBank – Determiners Practice
 SIL Glossary of linguistic terms – What is a determiner?

Parts of speech
Grammar
Syntactic categories
 Grammatical marker type